"We Are the World" is a song recorded by the Dutch group Twenty 4 Seven. It was released in summer 1996 as a single from their fourth studio album Twenty 4 Hours A Day, Seven Days A Week. Vocalist Nance Coolen was replaced by Stella after Nance had left the group. The chorus was sung by Stella and the rap by Stay-C. The video was filmed in Aalsmeer in Amsterdam (The Netherlands) and directed by Steve Walker.

Track listings
 CD maxi
 "We Are The World" (Single Mix)                                    — 3:37 
 "We Are The World" (Generations Mixx)                              — 4:02
 "We Are The World" (RVR Long Version)                              — 5:17
 "We Are The World" (The World According To Ruyters & Romero Remix) — 4:39
 "We Are The World" (Dancehall Mixx)                                — 4:22
 "We Are The World" (Fijay Valasco Club Mix)                        — 5:35
 "We Are The World" (Instrumental World)                            — 3:37 

 CD single
 "We Are The World" (Single Mix)                                    — 3:37 
 "We Are The World" (Instrumental World)                            — 3:37

Vinyl 12"
 "We Are The World" (Single Mix)                                    — 3:37 
 "We Are The World" (Generations Mixx)                              — 4:02
 "We Are The World" (RVR Long Version)                              — 5:17
 "We Are The World" (The World According To Ruyters & Romero Remix) — 4:39
 "We Are The World" (Dancehall Mixx)                                — 4:22
 "We Are The World" (Fijay Valasco Club Mix)                        — 5:35
 "We Are The World" (Instrumental World)                            — 3:37

Charts

References

1996 singles
1996 songs
Twenty 4 Seven songs
CNR Music singles
Songs written by Ruud van Rijen